Kenneth Raymond Suarez (Born April 12, 1943) is an American former professional baseball player. He played as a catcher in Major League Baseball (MLB) from 1966 to 1973. The , . right-handed hitter is best remembered for a suit he filed against the Texas Rangers in which he claimed that his February 12, 1974, trade to the Cleveland Indians was in retaliation for his having filed for arbitration. Suarez never reported to camp for the Indians, instead retiring at age 30.

Early life
Suarez was born in Tampa, Florida, and attended Jesuit High School. As well as being the catcher for the Jesuit Tigers, Suarez played for West Tampa's American Legion team with Lou Piniella and Tony La Russa.

Suarez attended Florida State University, and took over catching duties for the Seminoles baseball team as a sophomore in 1963. After leading his team to the College World Series in 1963, Suarez erupted his junior year. He batted .404 with 44 hits, six home runs, thirty runs batted in, 25 runs scored and 21 walks, all tops on his team. He was named a 1964 First Team All-American by the American Baseball Coaches Association. He represented the United States in baseball at the 1964 Summer Olympics as a demonstration sport in Tokyo. Suarez then signed with the Kansas City Athletics as an amateur free agent.

Baseball career

Kansas City A's
Suarez's first professional hit was a grand slam while playing for the Lewiston Broncs in 1965. That season, he batted .253 with thirteen home runs and twenty RBIs while providing excellent defense for the Broncs and Double-A Birmingham Barons to earn an invitation to spring training in 1966. He won the starting job out of camp, but lost the job to Phil Roof after batting just .185 with two RBI through May. He hung around at the major league level through the All-Star break before being optioned to Double-A Mobile.

An injury to Roof early in the 1967 season once again earned Suarez a promotion to starting catcher. He hit his first major league home run in his first start of the season against Mickey Lolich of the Detroit Tigers. He batted .235 with two home runs and four RBI in eight games filling in for Roof. Once Roof returned, Suarez remained with the club as a back-up catcher. After the season, he was drafted by the Cleveland Indians in the 1967 Rule 5 draft. Alvin Dark, who had been his manager with Kansas City, was now the Indians' manager and wanted the player on his new team.

Cleveland Indians
Suarez did not receive much playing time in Cleveland, appearing in only seventeen games in 1968, two of which were out of his natural position in extra inning affairs. He had just one hit in ten at-bats. He split 1969 between the Indians and the Pacific Coast League Portland Beavers, batting .294 with nine RBIs in 85 major league at-bats. He spent all of 1970 in the minors with the Wichita Aeros, and batted .301, marking the only time he batted over .300 in his professional career. Given a more regular role in 1971, Suarez appeared in 50 games for the Indians, hitting only .203 in 123 at-bats.

Texas Rangers
He was traded with Roy Foster, Rich Hand, and Mike Paul from the Indians to the Texas Rangers for Del Unser, Denny Riddleberger, Terry Ley and Gary Jones at the Winter Meetings on December 2, 1971. He spent most of his first season with the Rangers as the third string catcher before being reassigned to the Double-A Denver Bears. He platooned with Dick Billings behind the plate in 1973, and produced a .248 batting average while establishing himself as one of the better fielding catchers in the American League. On June 16, he broke up a Jim Palmer perfect game. Palmer had retired the first 25 batters, however Suarez singled with one out in the ninth inning.

Suarez earned $20,000 in 1973 for the Rangers, and felt he was due for a raise. On February 7, 1974, he met with Rangers general manager Dan O'Brien Sr. to negotiate a new contract. Failing to reach an agreement, he became the first player on the team to submit a contract to arbitration. Five days later, he was traded back to the Cleveland Indians for shortstop Leo Cárdenas.

Suarez was traded on September 12, 1974 to the California Angels with Rusty Torres for Frank Robinson.

Overall, Suarez hit .227 with five home runs and 60 RBI in 295 games (661 at-bats). He walked 99 times and struck out 97 times.

Personal life
After baseball, Suarez and his wife stayed in Fort Worth, Texas. He has worked in various fields, including aviation, radio and now is the polk county reporter for fox 13 tampa

References

External links

Living people
All-American college baseball players
Major League Baseball catchers
Texas Rangers players
Cleveland Indians players
Kansas City Athletics players
Baseball players from Tampa, Florida
Florida State Seminoles baseball players
Olympic baseball players of the United States
1943 births
Birmingham Barons players
Lewiston Broncs players
Mobile A's players
Birmingham A's players
Portland Beavers players
Wichita Aeros players
Denver Bears players
Jesuit High School (Tampa) alumni
Baseball players at the 1964 Summer Olympics